The R613 road is a regional road in Ireland which runs west-east from the R589 in Halfway to the N28 in the centre of Ringaskiddy. The road forms a vital part of the road network south of Cork City.

Part of the road between Halfway and Ballinhassig was formerly part of the N71 until this part was replaced by a new section in the 1990s.  

See also
Roads in Ireland
Motorways in Ireland
National primary road
National secondary road
History of roads in Ireland

References

Roads Act 1993 (Classification of Regional Roads) Order 2006 – Department of Transport

Regional roads in the Republic of Ireland
Roads in County Cork